This is a list of venues used for professional baseball in Vancouver, British Columbia, Canada. The information is a synthesis of the information contained in the references listed.

Recreation Park
Home of:
Vancouver Beavers aka Horse Doctors / Champions – Northwestern League (1905–1912)
Location: Homer Street (northwest, first base); Smithe Street (northeast, third base); Hamilton Street / Mainland Street (southeast, left field); Nelson / Cambie Street (southwest, right field)
Currently: office buildings and the small Yaletown Park

Athletic Park renamed Sick's Capilano Stadium (I)
Home of:
Vancouver Beavers – NWL / Pacific Coast International League  (1913–1919) disbanded with league during 1919 season
Vancouver Beavers – Pacific Coast International League (1920–1922) disbanded with league during 1922 season
Vancouver Beavers – Western International League (1939–1950)
Location: Hemlock Street (west, first base); 6th Avenue (south, right field); Birch Street (east, left field); railroad tracks (northeast); 5th Avenue imaginary line (north, third base)
Currently: commercial and residential

Nat Bailey Stadium orig. Capilano Stadium (II)
Home of:
Vancouver Mounties – Pacific Coast League (PCL) (1956–1962)
Vancouver Mounties – PCL (1965–1969)
Vancouver Canadians – PCL (1978–1999)
Vancouver Canadians – Northwest League (2000–2020, 2022–present)
Location: 4601 Ontario Street (east, third base); Midlothian Street (southwest, center field); Hillcrest Park and DinMont Avenue (northwest, first base)

Ron Tonkin Field orig. Hillsboro Ballpark
Home of:
Vancouver Canadians – NWL (2021 during Covid pandemic)
Hillsboro Hops - NWL starting in 2013
Location: (Hillsboro, Oregon) 4450 NE Century Blvd aka NW 229th Avenue (southwest, right field); otherwise surrounded by Gordon Faber Recreation Complex

See also
Lists of baseball parks

References
Peter Filichia, Professional Baseball Franchises, Facts on File, 1993.

Vancouver-related lists